is a Japanese pop singer formerly of Hello! Project. She was a sub-leader and member of Japanese idol group Juice=Juice. Her fruit in the group is lemon.

She left Hello! Project and Juice=Juice on 12 February 2021.

Biography
Takagi joined Hello! Pro Egg in November 2009.
She was later introduced as a member of Hello! Pro Egg at the 2009 Hello! Project Shinjin Kōen 11-tsuki: Yokohama Fire! on 23 November 2009.
In October 2010 Takagi co-starred with Ayano Sato in the third Gekijō-ban Hontō ni Atta Kowai Hanashi 3D film Darekairu.
On the 3 February 2013 she was chosen of a new group along with Tomoko Kanazawa, Yuka Miyazaki, Akari Uemura, Karin Miyamoto, and Aina Ōtsuka. The name of the new group was revealed as Juice=Juice on the 25 February. The group made their major debut with the single "Romance no Tochū / Watashi ga Iu Mae ni Dakishimenakya ne (Memorial Edit) / Samidare Bijo ga Samidareru (Memorial Edit)" on 11 September.

Publications

Videos

Filmography

Concerts

Events

Stage

Musicals

Films

TV dramas

Variety

References

External links
 

1997 births
Japanese female idols
Japanese women pop singers
Living people
Juice=Juice members
Musicians from Chiba Prefecture